The Nursing Service Cross (NSC) is a conspicuous service decoration of the Australian honours and awards system, instituted by Letters Patent on 18 October 1989.

The Nursing Service Cross is awarded to medics (enrolled nurses) and nurses (registered nurses) of the Australian Defence Force for outstanding devotion and competency in the performance of nursing duties, or for an act of exceptional dedication in the performance of such duties, in warlike or non-warlike conditions.

There have been 28 recipients, and 29 awards, since the Nursing Service Cross was instituted on 18 October 1989. Jonathan Aharon Walter is the sole awardee to have received the Nursing Service Cross more than once, first in 2004, and then again in 2007 (when he was awarded a Bar to his existing Nursing Service Cross).

The current Command Sergeant Major – Forces Command, Warrant Officer Class One Kim Felmingham, is also a Nursing Service Cross recipient. As of March 2010, nominations for the award of the Nursing Service Cross were suspended by determination of the Chief of Defence Force.

Design
The Nursing Service Cross is a four-stepped sterling silver equidistant straight armed cross, ensigned with the Crown of Saint Edward, surmounted by a plain sterling silver suspender bar. The obverse (front of the medal) has a transparent red enamel cross insert, overlaid on a flecked pattern radiating from the centre of the cross.

The reverse (rear) of the Nursing Service Cross has a horizontal panel that displays the recipient's details, superimposed on a design of fluted rays of varying lengths.

The Nursing Service Cross is suspended on a 32 mm ribbon, that has a central deep red band 12 mm wide, flanked by two white vertical bands 8 mm wide, and is edged in gold bands 2 mm wide. The symbolism of the colours used on the ribbon for the Nursing Service Cross is that the gold represents the colour of sand, white represents purity, and the deep red colour used (which is the colour of a native sedge flower) is a link between a natural Australian colour and the red cross.

Second and subsequent awards of the Nursing Service Cross are recognised by a sterling silver bar with a superimposed central 6mm wide red enamel cross insert, worn on the ribbon above the medal (and an 8 mm wide cross of red enamel worn centrally on the ribbon bar, and a half sized bar on the ribbon of the miniature cross).

The miniature of the Nursing Service Cross is a half-sized replica of the cross, suspended from a miniature of the ribbon that is 16 mm wide.

A lapel badge, being a 10 mm wide replica of the cross, is also provided to awardees.

History
The award of medals for conspicuous conduct can be traced back to 1643 (potentially even earlier). Before 18 October 1989, eligible Australian Defence Force (ADF) members could be awarded the Royal Red Cross under the Imperial honours system. About 250 Australian nurses received one of the two classes of the Royal Red Cross between the Boer War and the Vietnam War. The last time the Royal Red Cross was awarded in Australia, which had never been intended as a specific award for Australian military nurses, was on 31 December 1981.

Origin
When Australian Prime Minister Bob Hawke came to power in 1983, he declared his government would no longer be making any recommendations for Imperial honours and awards. On 26 January 1986, Hawke announced the intention to seek Letters Patent for a new military award to recognise outstanding operational and non-operational service by Australian Defence Force nurses, to be called the Australian Nursing Service Cross. On 17 July 1986, the Australian Government announced a competition to design the Nursing Service Cross. On 12 December 1986, the competition winners had their design concepts and ideas forwarded to qualified designers, sculptors and engravers for finalisation.

On 18 October 1989, the Queen of Australia, Elizabeth II, issued Letters Patent instituting the Nursing Service Cross decoration.

Suspension of new nominations
On 3 March 2010, the Nursing Service Cross (while it is still active as an award in the Australian honours and awards scheme) was closed to new nominations by determination of the Chief of Defence Force. Awards to eligible defence members for outstanding devotion or exceptional dedication to nursing duties are now considered under the Order of Australia, Distinguished Service and Conspicuous Service awards criteria, as applicable.

2017 commemorative coin
In 2017, the Royal Australian Mint produced for News Corp Australia a 20 cent non-circulating legal tender coin and card (241,744 produced) to commemorate the Nursing Service Cross, that was available from participating newsagents in April 2017. The nickel plated copper coin had the following features:
 Reverse – A representation of the Nursing Service Cross decoration, including suspender bar and ribbon. Positioned in the centre of a wreath at the bottom of the coin face is a representation of the St Edward's Crown. The design included the number '20' and the inscription 'NURSING SERVICE CROSS'.
 Obverse – An effigy of Her Majesty Queen Elizabeth II, together with the inscriptions 'ELIZABETH II', 'AUSTRALIA' and the inscription, in numerals, of the year 2017, as well as the initials of the coin's designer Ian Rank-Broadley 'IRB'.

List of recipients
There have been 28 recipients, and 29 awards, since the Nursing Service Cross was established on 18 October 1989. Jonathan Aharon Walter is the sole awardee to have received the Nursing Service Cross twice, first in 2004, and then again in 2007 (when he was awarded a Bar to his existing Nursing Service Cross).

See also
 Australian honours and awards system
 Australian Honours Order of Wearing
 Post-nominal letters (Australia)

Notes

References

Military awards and decorations of Australia
1989 establishments in Australia
Awards established in 1989
Military nursing
Nursing awards
Nursing in Australia